Victim of Love may refer to:

Music 
 Victim of Love (Elton John album), 1979, or the title song
 Victim of Love (Charles Bradley album), 2013
 Victim of Love (Dee Dee Bridgewater album), 1989
 "Victim of Love" (Erasure song), 1987
 "Victim of Love" (The Cars song), 1982
 "Victim of Love", a song by Sweet Sensation from Take It While It's Hot album
 "Victim of Love", a song by Bryan Adams from Into the Fire
 "Victim of Love", a song by Cash Cash from Love or Lust
 "Victim of Love", a song by the Eagles from Hotel California

Other media 
 Victim of Love (1923 film), a silent German film
 Victim of Love (1991 film), a psychological thriller starring Pierce Brosnan
 Victim of Love: The Shannon Mohr Story, a 1993 TV movie featuring Andrea Parker
 Victim of Love (novel), a 1982 novel by Dyan Sheldon

See also
 "Victims of Love", a song by Joe Lamont from Secrets You Keep
 "Victims of Love", a song by Good Charlotte from Good Morning Revival